As sovereign, King Charles III is the living embodiment of The Crown in 15 countries known as the Commonwealth realms. The King resides primarily in the oldest and most populous realm, the United Kingdom, and is represented in the other countries by the following viceregal representatives. The monarch is also represented in each of the Canadian provinces, Australian states, British overseas territories and Crown dependencies, and the states in free association with New Zealand.

Commonwealth realms

Governors-general

Counsellors of state
In the United Kingdom, the sovereign appoints counsellors of state to act on the monarch's behalf when he or she is not present in the country or unable for other reasons to perform royal constitutional functions.

Crown dependencies
The three Crown dependencies—Guernsey, the Isle of Man, and Jersey—are possessions of the Crown of the United Kingdom, not of the government of the United Kingdom, and the monarch is head of state. There, the monarch is represented by lieutenant governors.

British Overseas Territories

In the fourteen British Overseas Territories, The King is represented by either an Administrator, a Commissioner, or a Governor.

States in free association with New Zealand
In the Realm of New Zealand, the Cook Islands has a separate King's Representative. Niue is entitled to one, but, under the Niue Constitution Act, the monarch is represented by New Zealand's Governor-General.

Sub-national representatives
The following list is restricted to those who represent the Crown directly. Since Administrators of Australian territories represent the Governor-General, they are not included here. Commissioners of Canadian territories do not represent the monarch, but the federal government, and are not included.

Australia
In the six Australian states, the King is represented by a governor.

Canada
In the ten Canadian provinces, the King is represented by a lieutenant governor.

See also
List of Commonwealth heads of government
List of leaders of dependent territories
Lord-lieutenant

References

Commonwealth realms
British monarchy-related lists
Commonwealth of Nations-related lists
Lists of governors-general
Governors-General of Commonwealth countries